Johan Darbes   (1750 – June 15, 1815) was a Danish composer and violinist in the Chapels Royal from 1770 - 1786 .

See also
List of Danish composers

References
This article was initially translated from the Danish Wikipedia.

Danish composers
Male composers
1750 births
1815 deaths